Pohatcong Mountain is a ridge, approximately 6 mi (10 km) long, in the Appalachian Mountains of northwestern New Jersey in the United States. It extends from west Phillipsburg northeast approximately to Allamuchy Township, New Jersey. The ridge continues on north past Washington as Upper Pohatcong Mountain. The term "Pohatcong Mountain" is sometimes taken to include both mountains. The ridge is approximately 800 ft (244 m) high along much of its length.

The mountain divides the watersheds of Pohatcong Creek on its northwestern flank and the Musconetcong River on its southeastern flank.

References

Ridges of New Jersey
Landforms of Warren County, New Jersey